Myszków  is a town in Poland, with 31,650 inhabitants (2019). Situated on the Warta river in the Silesian Voivodeship (since 1999), previously in Częstochowa Voivodeship (1975–1998), it is the capital of Myszków County. Myszków historically belongs to Lesser Poland, and the area where the town is now located, until the Partitions of Poland was part of Kraków Voivodeship’s County of Lelów. Myszków is located along one of the oldest Polish rail lines – the Warsaw–Vienna railway, also, near the town goes another important rail line – the Central Rail Line

Coat of arms
Myszków has for years been a center of heavy industry, which is reflected in the town's coat of arms. Created in 1969, it shows four black smokestacks, with fumes coming from the two in the middle. Above the smokestacks is the White Eagle, on the sides are two heads of corn, and the blue ribbon symbolizes the Warta river.

History
The history of the town called Myszków is very short, and goes back to 1925, when the commune (gmina) of Myszków was created, part of Kielce Voivodeship. It was incorporated as a town in 1950, and the Myszków County was created in 1956. After World War II (August 1945), Lesser Poland's Myszków was transferred to Silesian – Dąbrowa Voivodeship, which in 1950 changed name to Katowice Voivodeship. In 1975 Myszków became part of Częstochowa Voivodeship, and in 1983 the town expanded, when the villages of Potasznia, Mrzygłód, Mrzygłódka, Nierada, Krwciwilk, Ręby, Łabry' and Smudzówka were annexed. As a result, currently Myszków covers a large area – it is the 139th most populated town of Poland, but the 50th in terms of territory.

Geography
Since 1925 it has been the seat of a gmina, but Myszków officially remained a village until 1950, when it received town charter. Today's Myszków is made of a number of former villages, towns and settlements (Mrzygłód, Nowa Wieś, Pohulanka, Będusz, Helenówka, Myszków, Mijaczów, Ciszówka), which had existed here for centuries. The town is located on the elevation of 280 meters above sea level, in a valley between Silesian Highlands and Polish Jura, and some of its districts are part of the Jura Landscape Parks. Myszków is characteristic for its settlement type of architecture, which is the result of mergers of numerous villages into its borders.

Sights
Among points of interest are the 19th-century rail station, the Palace of August Schmelzer (1880s), and neogothic Church of St. Stanislaus (1908–1936).

Sports
Myszków is home to a sports club MKS Myszków, which was founded in 1947, and whose name changed several times (Jedność, Stal, Papiernik, Krisbut, MŻKS).

Twin towns – sister cities

Myszków is twinned with:

 Los Alcázares, Spain
 Békés, Hungary
 Kopřivnice, Czech Republic
 Námestovo, Slovakia
 Zwönitz, Germany

References

External links
 Official website
 Myszków Info – Independent regional informer
 Jewish Community in Myszków on Virtual Shtetl

Cities and towns in Silesian Voivodeship
Myszków County
Kraków Voivodeship (14th century – 1795)
Piotrków Governorate
Kielce Voivodeship (1919–1939)